Fernando Andrade dos Santos, sometimes known as just Fernando (born 8 January 1993) is a Brazilian footballer who currently plays for Porto.

Club career
He made his professional debut in the Campeonato Paulista for São Caetano on 24 March 2003 in a game against Grêmio Catanduvense.
  
In January 2019, he moved to FC Porto.

On 7 August 2021, Fernando Andrade joined Al-Fayha on loan from Porto.

Honours
Porto
Primeira Liga: 2021–22
Taça de Portugal: 2021–22

References

External links
 

1993 births
Footballers from São Paulo
Living people
Brazilian footballers
Association football forwards
Associação Desportiva São Caetano players
Vissel Kobe players
Guarani FC players
Rio Branco Esporte Clube players
Clube Oriental de Lisboa players
F.C. Penafiel players
C.D. Santa Clara players
FC Porto players
Al-Fayha FC players
J1 League players
Primeira Liga players
Liga Portugal 2 players
Saudi Professional League players
Brazilian expatriate footballers
Expatriate footballers in Japan
Expatriate footballers in Portugal
Expatriate footballers in Saudi Arabia
Brazilian expatriate sportspeople in Saudi Arabia